Cherie Bennett (born 1960 in Buffalo, New York) is an American novelist, actress, director, playwright, newspaper columnist, singer, and television writer on the CBS Daytime soap opera The Young and the Restless.

Biography
The writing was not Bennett's early focus. Sometimes known as the "Big and Tall Barbie Doll", she attended Wayne State University, and then the University of Michigan in the early 1980s, as a musical theatre major. She worked frequently as an actress, doing national musical tours, regional theatre productions including Mark Medoff's When You Comin' Back, Red Ryder? and a well-reviewed turn in the off-Broadway revival of Tennessee Williams' Twenty-Seven Wagons Full of Cotton. She headed her own improv comedy trio, Zaniac, and performed as a vocalist, singing backup for John Mellencamp and in her play, Honk Tonk Angels.

Bennett's favourite non-writing activities are reading (memoirs, medical mysteries, and show-biz stories), film, theatre, cooking, politics, and Internet shopping. She lives in Los Angeles with her son.

Her pseudonyms are C.J. Anders, and Carrie Austen. For many years, she wrote frequently with Jeff Gottesfeld, with whom she shared the Zoey Dean pseudonym. She and Jeff are divorced.

Her father was a writer for such shows as The Twilight Zone, Route 66, and Sid Caesar's Your Show of Shows.

Since June 2011, she's been the Artistic Director at Amusings Productions in Sherman Oaks.

Television credits
The Young and the Restless (hired by Lynn Marie Latham; fired by Maria Arena Bell)
Script Writer: December 14, 2006 - December 21, 2007; March 18 - August 19, 2008
Associate Head Writer: July 2007 - December 21, 2007; March 18 - July 10, 2008

As the World Turns (hired by Hogan Sheffer)
 Breakdown Writer: 2005

Port Charles (hired by Lynn Marie Latham)
 Story Consultant: 1998

Another World
 Story Consultant: 1997

Girls Got Game: 2006

Smallville: 2001 - 2002

Books
Book Series
Sunset Island (forty-one book series)
Dawson's Creek (seven original novels)
Mirror Image (four book series)
Hope Hospital (three book series)

Six Book Series
University Hospital
Wild Hearts
Teen Angels
Trash
Pageant

Other Books
Turn Me On (July 2007)
Girls in Love
Zink
Life in the Fat Lane
A Heart Divided
Anne Frank and Me
Searching for David's Heart

Plays
John Lennon And Me
Sex And Rage In A SoHo Loft
Life In The Fat Lane
Zink
Searching for David's Heart fme
A Heart Divided
Cyra And Rocky
Reviving Ophelia (adapted from the book by Dr. Mary Pipher)

Films
Broken Bridges (Writer: 2006)

Newspaper column
"Hey, Cherie!" (Weekly teen advice column through Copley News Service)

Awards and nominations
Daytime Emmy: Outstanding Drama Series Writing Team, 2008
Macy's Prize For Playwriting: Reviving Ophelia, 2005–2006
Humanitas Award: Best children's film for television (Searching For David's Heart, 2005)
American Library Association: Best Books For Young Adults, 2005 nominee (A Heart Divided)
International Reading Association: Young Adult Readers' Choice, Anne Frank And Me, 2003
American Alliance of Theater And Education UPR, 2000 winner (David's Heart)
American Library Association: Best Books For Young Adults, 1999

References

External links
Hachette Book Group USA: Bennett
Publishers Weekly: Bennett
Greenwich Times: Bennett's Column
Smart Writers Interview
TeenReads 2003 Interview

American women novelists
20th-century American novelists
American soap opera writers
Screenwriters from New York (state)
Daytime Emmy Award winners
American women television writers
1960 births
Living people
Soap opera producers
Television producers from New York (state)
American women television producers
Wayne State University alumni
University of Michigan School of Music, Theatre & Dance alumni
Businesspeople from Buffalo, New York
Writers from Buffalo, New York
Jewish American writers
21st-century American novelists
American women dramatists and playwrights
20th-century American women writers
21st-century American women writers
20th-century American dramatists and playwrights
Women soap opera writers
Novelists from New York (state)
21st-century American Jews